Shaw, Savill & Albion Line was the trading name of Shaw, Savill and Albion Steamship Company, a British shipping company that operated ships between Great Britain, Australia and New Zealand.

History

The company was created in 1882 by the amalgamation of Shaw, Savill and Company and Albion Line.

At the annual shareholders' meeting of the company on 12 April 1892, profits for the year of £35,270 16s 2d were announced.
 

In 1928 White Star Line bought 18 Shaw, Savill and Albion ships. In 1932 Shaw, Savill and Albion took over Aberdeen Line, and in 1933 Furness, Withy Co., Ltd. acquired control of Shaw, Savill and Albion.

Shaw, Savill and Albion ran refrigerated cargo liners between New Zealand and the UK via the Panama Canal.  In the 1930s Harland and Wolff built for Shaw, Savill four  refrigerated cargo motor ships: Waiwera and Waipawa launched in 1934, Wairangi launched in 1935 and  launched in 1938. As well as being unusually large for their era, the "W-class" were among the swiftest cargo ships in the World. On sea trials Waimarama achieved .

In 1936, Shaw, Savill and Albion announced plans to sell Ionic. She was scrapped in 1936 or 1937 in Osaka, Japan. Her unique initials stood for "Quadruple Screw Motor Vessel".

In the Second World War Dominion Monarch was a highly successful troop ship. A U-boat sank Waiwera in June 1942. The "W-class" refrigerated ships' unusually high speed led to both Wairangi and Waimarama being selected for Operation Pedestal to relieve Malta. Both were sunk by enemy action on 13 August 1942, the day before the convoy reached its destination. Waiwapa was the only member of the "W-class" to survive the war.

The   replaced Dominion Monarch in 1962. As the scheduled liner trade declined, the company laid up Southern Cross in 1972, initially in the Port of Southampton, and after 6 months she sailed to the River Fal for further lay up until being sold to Greek interests in 1973; after a major transformation she reappeared as Calypso.

With the company losing money and the oil crisis of 1973 having a major effect on the company a decision was made to withdraw Northern Star and Ocean Monarch from service in 1975, with both ships being sold to Taiwanese breakers. Northern Star was only 13 years old when she was scrapped. With a long history of mechanical problems there was no potential purchaser of her.

A variation of the flag used by the United Tribes of New Zealand was used by the Shaw, Savill & Albion Line as its company flag.

References

Notes

Bibliography

External links

 
Transport companies established in 1882
Defunct cruise lines
Defunct shipping companies of the United Kingdom